John Balfour may refer to:

 John Balfour (courtier), servant of Mary, Queen of Scots
 John Balfour, 3rd Lord Balfour of Burleigh (died 1688), Scottish lord
 John Balfour, 1st Baron Kinross (1837–1905), Scottish lawyer and politician
 John Balfour, 3rd Baron Kinross (1904–1976), Scottish historian and writer 
 John Balfour (bishop) (died 1488), bishop of Brechin, 1465–1488
 John Balfour (diplomat) (1894–1983), British ambassador
 John Balfour (Orkney MP) (1750–1842), British politician
 John Hutton Balfour (1808–1884), Scottish botanist
 John Balfour (Queensland politician) (1820–1875), member of the Queensland Legislative Council